Chirk railway station serves the town of Chirk, Wrexham County Borough, Wales. The original 19th-century (grade 2 listed) Chirk / Y Waun station building was demolished in 1987, without consultation, by the local council.

Chirk was also the eastern terminus and transfer point for the Glyn Valley Tramway.

Historical services 
According to the Official Handbook of Stations the following classes of traffic were being handled at this station in 1956: G, P, F, L, H, C and there was a 15 cwt crane. At one time there was also a private siding into the Cadbury's factory from where cocoa liquor was sent to the chocolate factory at Bournville.

The railway itself superseded the Llangollen Canal, which runs parallel to the railway through Chirk, for the transportation of coal and other goods.

Facilities 
The station is unstaffed (and has been since 1974) but has a ticket vending machine where passengers may buy or collect pre-booked tickets before boarding. Stone waiting shelters are provided on both platforms, along with a fully accessible ramped footbridge linking them – this was installed in 2015 as part of a £2 million Welsh Assembly-funded station improvement project. Train running information is provided via the CIS displays, automated announcements and timetable posters.

Current services 

Passenger
Trains run on two routes operated by Transport for Wales:
Hourly northbound service to Holyhead via Wrexham General and Chester.
Hourly southbound service to Shrewsbury then continuing alternately to give a two-hourly service to both  via Birmingham New Street and Cardiff Central via .

Some early morning & late evening trains run only between Shrewsbury and either Wrexham General or Chester only, whilst there is a single late evening service northbound to Manchester Piccadilly on weekdays only.  Sundays see a two-hourly service to Chester & Birmingham International with a limited number of services to Holyhead & Cardiff.

Freight
To the north of Chirk station on the Up (southbound) side of the line is a private siding into the Kronospan chipboard factory. The siding receives a trainload of softwood from Kingmoor Yard, Cumbria five days a week (Monday to Friday), and additionally, between the months of April and October, up to three trains a week of softwood from Ribblehead, North Yorkshire. Since 2007 these timber trains have been operated to the Chirk Kronospan factory by Colas Rail Ltd.

Gallery

References

Further reading

External links 

 Chester to Shrewsbury Rail Partnership

 Chirk station on navigable 1946 O.S. map

Railway stations in Wrexham County Borough
DfT Category F2 stations
Former Great Western Railway stations
Railway stations in Great Britain opened in 1848
Railway stations served by Transport for Wales Rail
Chirk